Chalcolepidius porcatus is a species of beetles in the family Elateridae.

Description
The coloration may be green, yellowish-green or brown, with striated pronotum.

Distribution
This species occurs in Peru, Colombia, Bolivia.

References
 Biolib
 Universal Biological Indexer
 Elateridae de Colombia
 Sônia Aparecida Casari Review of the genus Chalcolepidius Eschscholtz, 1829 (Coleoptera, Elateridae, Agrypninae)

External links
 Chalcolepidius porcatus

porcatus
Beetles described in 1767
Taxa named by Carl Linnaeus